Ask Grandma is a 1925 American short silent comedy film directed by Robert F. McGowan. It was the 39th Our Gang short subject released.

Plot

Mickey's overprotective mother is trying to raise her son as a gentleman by dressing him like a sissy and enrolling him in dance school. Mickey takes things particularly hard when he sees the gang playing with a toy airplane. The only family member who sympathizes with Mickey's plight is his Grandma, who knows that he is harboring a serious crush on precocious Mary. Grandma encourages Mickey to pursue Mary and agrees to cover for him when he sneaks away to visit her. Neighborhood bully Johnny — who also has eyes for Mary — looks for someone to slug and picks on Joe. Mickey sees this and the two face off. Mickey gets the worst of it until Grandma rallies him on, resulting in Johnny getting pretty well socked. His father comes to his rescue to help in beating up Mickey just as Grandma gets into the fight. Mickey's mother, having witnessed her son in action, comes to realize that Mickey should be a "regular boy" moving forward.

Cast

The Gang
 Joe Cobb – Joe
 Jackie Condon – Jackie
 Mickey Daniels – Mickey
 Johnny Downs – Johnny
 Allen Hoskins – Farina
 Mary Kornman – Mary
 Sonny Loy Sing – Joy

Additional cast
 David Sharpe – kid in flashback / stunt double
 Gabe Saienz – kid in flashback
 Florence Lee – Grandma
 Lyle Tayo – Martha, Mickey's mother
 Noah Young – Johnny's father
 Katherine Grant – ballet instructor

References

External links

1925 films
1925 short films
1925 comedy films
American silent short films
American black-and-white films
Films directed by Robert F. McGowan
Hal Roach Studios short films
Our Gang films
1920s American films
Silent American comedy films